The 2001 Northern Iowa Panthers football team represented the University of Northern Iowa as a member of the Gateway Football Conference during the 2001 NCAA Division I-AA football season. Led by first-year head coach Mark Farley, the Panthers compiled an overall record of 11–3 with a mark of 6–1 in conference play, winning the Gateway  title. Northern Iowa advanced to the NCAA Division I-AA Football Championship playoffs, where they beat Eastern Illinois in the first round and Maine in the quarterfinals, before falling to eventual national champion Montana in the semifinals.

Schedule

References

Northern Iowa
Northern Iowa Panthers football seasons
Missouri Valley Football Conference champion seasons
Northern Iowa Panthers football